Hekou is a village under the administration of the town of Shuanghe in Togtoh County, Inner Mongolia, China.

Names
The Chinese name of the villageromanized as Hokow for the Postal Mapderives from its location near the mouth of the Dahei River  Dàhēi Hé, “Great Black River”).

In Mongolian, it was formerly known as Tchagan Kouren (“White Enclosure” or “Camp”), Dugus, or Dugei. The name was sometimes shortened to "Tchagan" in English.

Geography
Hekou lies at the confluence of the Dahei River with the Yellow River on the northern curve of the Ordos Loop.

Hekou is widely considered to mark the boundary between the Upper and Middle sections of the Yellow River. Lying at the northeastern end of the Ordos Desert, the confluence of the Dahei with the Yellow River marks the beginning of a series of major inflows from the Loess Plateau that greatly increase the river's volume and siltation after a long period of relative calm.

History

In the first half of the 19th century, Hekou was planned out with broad streets and large public squares lines with shade trees, something entirely unusual in northern China at the time. It was well-protected from the floods of the Yellow River by large embankments decorated with willows whose wood was worked into rafts used for downriver trade as far as Tongguan at the southeast end of the Ordos Loop. Hekou itself manufactured blocks of soda and, connected to caravan routes running east and west, carried on a sizable trade with the Mongols on the south side of the Yellow River. The caravans kept it well supplied, including with Russian goods, but its growth was curtailed by the proximity of the older caravan center at Hohhot.

Nonetheless, Hekou was visited by several European explorers on their way to Tibet, including Huc and Gabet (1844) and Rockhill (1891), and became well known in China and abroad as a dividing point for the Yellow River's central sections.

In 1938, during WWII, the Japanese-aligned Inner Mongolian Autonomous Government downgraded Hekou from town status to a village. (Because of its importance in relation to the Yellow River, however, it is still sometimes mistakenly referenced as a town in both Chinese and English sources.)

Famous people
Hekou was the hometown of Li Yuzhi (Lǐ Yùzhì), a Mongolian Communist martyred in 1927.

References

Citations

Bibliography
 .
 .
 .
 .
 .
 .
 .

External links

Villages in China